Rrashbull is a village and a former municipality in the Durrës County, western Albania. At the 2015 local government reform it became a subdivision of the municipality Durrës. The population at the 2011 census was 24,081.

Villages
The municipal unit consists of the following villages:
 Arapaj
 Bozanxhije
 Manskuri
 Romanat
 Rrashbull
 Shënavlash 
 Shkallnur
 Xhafzotaj

References

Administrative units of Durrës
Former municipalities in Durrës County
Villages in Durrës County
Populated places disestablished in 2015